Middle Branch Verdigre Creek is a  long fourth-order tributary to Verdigre Creek in Knox County, Nebraska.

Variant names
According to the Geographic Names Information System, it has also been known historically as:
Middle Branch Verdigree Creek

Course
Middle Branch Verdigre Creek rises on the Elkhorn River divide about 5 miles north-northeast of Page, Nebraska in Holt County and then flows northeast into Knox County and east to join Verdigre Creek about 3 miles southwest of Verdigre, Nebraska.

Watershed
Middle Branch Verdigre Creek drains  of area, receives about 25.68 in/year of precipitation, has a wetness index of 495.92, and is about 4.14% forested.

See also

List of rivers of Nebraska

References

Rivers of Holt County, Nebraska
Rivers of Knox County, Nebraska
Rivers of Nebraska